Ithan Station was a former train station of the Philadelphia and Western Railroad outside of Philadelphia, Pennsylvania.  It was constructed as a stop on the Strafford Branch of the line that is now known as the Norristown High Speed Line.  The station was active along what was then considered to be the main line (1907–1956) until the Norristown branch became the main line in 1912.  According to another source, the station was situated between the Wayne Junction and Radnor stations.

History

The station was part of the Philadelphia and Western Railroad line that ran from 69th Street station to Strafford when around when the corporation formed and when the line was active in 1907. The reorganized company had a capital stock of $4,000,000, consisting of $3,400,000 of common stock and $600,000 of 5% preferred stock.

The substation was built in 1907 and operated as a power substation for the railroad until 1919.  In 1920, Thomas Newhall (the president of the Philadelphia & Western Railroad) purchased the building for his personal use as a recreation and club room, including a squash court and space to house his gun collection.  In May 1947, six months after his wife died, Newhall (in a depression state) committed suicide in the building by means of a self-inflicted gunshot wound.

References

Former railway stations in Delaware County, Pennsylvania
Railway stations in the United States opened in 1907
Railway stations closed in 1956